The Minnesota Twins are a Major League Baseball (MLB) franchise based in Minneapolis, Minnesota. They play in the American League Central division. Since the institution of MLB's Rule 4 Draft, the Twins have selected 70 players in the first round. Officially known as the "First-Year Player Draft", the Rule 4 Draft is MLB's primary mechanism for assigning players from high schools, colleges, and other amateur clubs to its franchises. The draft order is determined based on the previous season's standings, with the team possessing the worst record receiving the first pick. In addition, teams which lost free agents in the previous off-season may be awarded compensatory or supplementary picks.

Of the 70 players picked in the first round by Minnesota, 30 have been pitchers, the most of any position; 22 of these were right-handed, while 8 were left-handed. Twelve outfielders were selected, while twelve shortstops, seven third basemen, four catchers, four first basemen and one player at second base were taken as well. Thirteen of the players came from high schools or universities in the state of California, and Florida follows with nine players. The Twins have drafted six players from Arizona, including five players from Arizona State University.

Two of the Twins' first-round picks have won championships with the franchise. Willie Banks (1987) and Chuck Knoblauch (1989) won a World Series title on the 1991 championship team. Knoblauch is also the only first-round draft pick of the Twins to win the MLB Rookie of the Year award, taking home the award in 1991. None of their first-round picks have been elected to the Baseball Hall of Fame. Catcher Joe Mauer (2001) won the 2009 American League Most Valuable Player award, the only first-round pick of the Twins to win the award. Mauer has also won three Silver Slugger Awards, two Rawlings Gold Glove Awards, and is the only catcher in MLB history to win three batting titles.

The Twins have made 16 selections in the supplemental round of the draft and have made the first overall selection twice (1983 and 2001). They have also had 18 compensatory picks since the institution of the First-Year Player Draft in 1965. These additional picks are provided when a team loses a particularly valuable free agent in the previous off-season, or, more recently, if a team fails to sign a draft pick from the previous year. The Twins have six times failed to sign their first-round pick. Eddie Leon (1965), Dick Ruthven (1972), Jamie Allen (1976), and Tim Belcher (1983) all failed to sign with the Twins without the team receiving compensation. The Twins did, however, receive a compensatory pick when they failed to sign Jason Varitek (1993). Varitek did not sign and instead chose to enter the draft again the following year and was taken by the Seattle Mariners. Additionally, Travis Lee, the Twins' only selection in 1996 and the second-overall pick of that draft, did not sign with the team. Lee's agent, Scott Boras, did not communicate with the Twins for the first two weeks after the draft and then invoked a rarely used rule that a team was required to make a contract offer within 15 days of the draft or relinquish their rights to the player. As a result, Lee and 3 other 1996 first-round picks who were Boras clients were granted free agency and he ultimately signed with the Arizona Diamondbacks.

Key

Picks

See also
Minnesota Twins minor league players

Footnotes
 Through the 2012 draft, free agents were evaluated by the Elias Sports Bureau and rated "Type A", "Type B", or not compensation-eligible. If a team offered arbitration to a player but that player refused and subsequently signed with another team, the original team was able to receive additional draft picks. If a "Type A" free agent left in this way, his previous team received a supplemental pick and a compensatory pick from the team with which he signed. If a "Type B" free agent left in this way, his previous team received only a supplemental pick. Since the 2013 draft, free agents are no longer classified by type; instead, compensatory picks are only awarded if the team offered its free agent a contract worth at least the average of the 125 current richest MLB contracts. However, if the free agent's last team acquired the player in a trade during the last year of his contract, it is ineligible to receive compensatory picks for that player.
The Twins gained a supplemental first-round pick in 1990 for losing free agent Jeff Reardon.
The Twins gained a supplemental first-round pick in 1991 for losing free agent Gary Gaetti.
The Twins gained a compensatory first-round pick in 1993 from the Cincinnati Reds for losing free agent John Smiley.
The Twins gained a supplemental first-round pick in 1993 for losing free agent John Smiley.
The Twins gained a supplemental first-round pick in 1993 for losing free agent Greg Gagne.
The Twins gained a supplemental first-round pick in 1994 for failing to sign 1993 first-round pick Jason Varitek.
The Twins gained a supplemental first-round pick in 1997 for failing to sign 1996 first-round pick Travis Lee.
The Twins gained a supplemental first-round pick in 2000 for losing free agent Mike Trombley.
The Twins gained a compensatory first-round pick in 2004 from the Seattle Mariners for losing free agent Eddie Guardado.
The Twins gained a compensatory first-round pick in 2004 from the Chicago Cubs for losing free agent LaTroy Hawkins.
The Twins gained a supplemental first-round pick in 2004 for losing free agent Eddie Guardado.
The Twins gained a supplemental first-round pick in 2004 for losing free agent LaTroy Hawkins.
The Twins gained a supplemental first-round pick in 2005 for losing free agent Corey Koskie.
The Twins gained a compensatory first-round pick in 2008 from the Los Angeles Angels of Anaheim for losing free agent Torii Hunter.
The Twins gained a supplemental first-round pick in 2008 for losing free agent Torii Hunter.
The Twins gained a supplemental first-round pick in 2009 for losing free agent Dennys Reyes.
The Twins gained a supplemental first-round pick in 2011 for losing free agent Orlando Hudson.
The Twins gained a supplemental first-round pick in 2011 for losing free agent Jesse Crain.
The Twins gained a supplemental first-round pick in 2012 for losing free agent Michael Cuddyer.
The Twins gained a supplemental first-round pick in 2012 for losing free agent Jason Kubel.

References
General references

In-text citations

First-round draft picks
Major League Baseball first-round draft picks